William Butler (1544–1577) was an English politician.

He was a Member (MP) of the Parliament of England for Queenborough in 1572.

References

1544 births
1577 deaths
English MPs 1572–1583
Members of the Parliament of England for Queenborough